Juozas Bernotas (born 23 April 1989 in Kaunas) is windsurfer from Lithuania. He started his career in 1999. His first coach was R.Vilkas, the second coach was G.Bernotas.

Biography 
Finished bachelor's and master's degrees in Lithuanian Sports University Lithuanian Academy of Physical Education. Married Gilija Bernotiene.

Achievements 
2007 World junior championship – 11th
2008 Kiel Week Germany - 33rd
2009 World championship Great Britain – 56th
2010 World Cup championship France - 55th
2010 World Cup championship Holland - 56th
2011 World championship – 37th
2011 Kiel Regatta (Kieler Woche) - 8th  
2011 World Cup championship Holland - 7th
2012 World championship Spain – 34th
2012 European championship Spain - 34th
2012 European championship Portugal – 32nd
2012 World Cup championship France - 17th
Sailing at the 2012 Summer Olympics – Men's RS:X - 12th
Sailing at the 2016 Summer Olympics – Men's RS:X - 26th
Sailing at the 2020 Summer Olympics – Men's RS:X - 15th

References

External links 
 
 
 
 
 

1989 births
Living people
Lithuanian male sailors (sport)
Olympic sailors of Lithuania
Sailors at the 2012 Summer Olympics – RS:X
Sailors at the 2016 Summer Olympics – RS:X
Sailors at the 2020 Summer Olympics – RS:X
Lithuanian windsurfers
Sportspeople from Kaunas